All India Institute of Medical Sciences, Rishikesh (AIIMS Rishikesh) is a medical college and hospital based in Rishikesh, Uttarakhand, India. The institute operates autonomously under the Ministry of Health and Family Welfare. Minister for Health and Family Welfare, serves as the president. It is one of the Institutes of National Importance in India.

History

In 2004, Central government decided to set up new AIIMS at Rishikesh, Bhopal, Patna, Jodhpur, Bhubaneswar and Raipur[4] Though the announcement was made in 2003 during Atal Bihari Vajpayee's tenure,[12] the project was delayed owing to the power shift at the centre. The All India Institute of Medical Sciences (Amendment) Bill, 2012 was introduced in the Lok Sabha on 27 August 2012. This bill also replaced a recent Ordinance which allowed the six AIIMS institutes to become operational from September 2012. Lok Sabha passed the AIIMS (Amendment) Bill on 30 August 2012. The proposed measure will help the Centre change the status of its six new AIIMS institutes registered under the Indian Societies Registration Act to be an autonomous body corporated on the lines of the existing AIIMS in Delhi. The AIIMS (Amendment) Bill, 2012 was introduced in the Rajya Sabha on 3 September 2012. The Rajya Sabha passed the AIIMS (Amendment) Bill, 2012 on 4 September 2012. AIIMS started its academic sessions in August 2012. A 200-bed hospital at AIIMS Rishikesh was inaugurated by then Union Health and Family Welfare Minister Ghulam Nabi Azad on 10 February 2014.

Hospital
, AIIMS Rishikesh hospital has 960 beds, 25 functional modular operating theatres, 17 functional super speciality and 18 speciality functional.

Medical College and Nursing College

AIIMS started its MBBS course with 50 students and now has an intake capacity of 125 students per year from year 2020. Nursing College has an intake of 100 students per year.

Directors 
Raj Kumar (2012–2016)
Sanjeev Misra  (2016–2017)
Ravi Kant (2017–2021)
Arvind Rajvanshi (2021–2022, additional charge)
Meenu Singh (2022–present)

See also
 All India Institute of Medical Sciences
 Education in India
 List of medical colleges in India

References

External links

 

Rishikesh
Hospitals in Uttarakhand
Medical colleges in Uttarakhand
Education in Dehradun district
Rishikesh
Educational institutions established in 2012
2012 establishments in Uttarakhand